Roderick McDonald (died April 7, 1885) was a physician and political figure in Canada West. He represented the town of Cornwall in the Legislative Assembly of the Province of Canada from 1852 to 1857.

He was the son of John McDonald, who settled on the Raisin River near St. Andrew's, and Ann McGillis. McDonald studied medicine at McGill University and graduated in 1834, he practised in Cornwall. He served as treasurer for the Stormont, Dundas and Glengarry United Counties and as lieutenant-colonel in the militia.

McDonald died on 7 April 1885.

References 

Year of birth missing
Members of the Legislative Assembly of the Province of Canada from Canada West
McGill University Faculty of Medicine alumni
1885 deaths